Sand shrimp may refer to:

Crangon affinis
Crangon crangon
Crangon septemspinosa
Metapenaeus ensis

Animal common name disambiguation pages